West Devon was a county constituency in Devon, in the South-West of England.  It returned one Member of Parliament (MP)  to the House of Commons of the Parliament of the United Kingdom, elected by the first past the post system.

The constituency was created for the February 1974 general election, and abolished for the 1983 general election, when it was largely replaced by the new Torridge and West Devon constituency.

Boundaries
The Municipal Boroughs of Great Torrington and Okehampton, and the Rural Districts of Holsworthy, Okehampton, Plympton St Mary, Tavistock, and Torrington.

Members of Parliament

Election results

References 

Parliamentary constituencies in Devon (historic)
Constituencies of the Parliament of the United Kingdom established in 1974
Constituencies of the Parliament of the United Kingdom disestablished in 1983